Ptycholytoceras is a genus of fast-moving nektonic ammonoid carnivores included in the Lytoceratinae in which the shell has round inner and depressed outer whorls and sides with dorso-ventrally sloping folds that do not pass onto the venter (outer rim).

The type species Phycholyioceras humile (Prinz), named by Spath, 1924, first described as Lytoceras humile by Prinz in 1904, came from the Lower Jurassic (Toarcian) of Hungary.

References
W.J.Arkell et al., 1957. Mesozoic Ammonoidea, Treatise on Invertebrate Paleontology, Part L. Geological Society of America and Univ Kansas press.

Ammonitida genera
Early Jurassic ammonites of Europe
Ammonites of Europe
Toarcian life
Lytoceratidae